Khaminovo is a rural locality (a village) in Pelshemskoye Rural Settlement, Sokolsky District, Vologda Oblast, Russia. The population was 2 as of 2002.

Geography 
Khaminovo is located 38 km southeast of Sokol (the district's administrative centre) by road. Tyrykovo is the nearest rural locality.

References 

Rural localities in Sokolsky District, Vologda Oblast